Rosianne Cutajar  (born 4 September 1988) is a Maltese politician of the Labour Party. She is a member of the Parliament of Malta representing the Sixth District electoral division. Cutajar was Parliamentary Secretary for Civil Rights and Reforms within the Ministry for Justice, Equality and Governance. As a junior minister within Prime Minister Robert Abela’s government, she was responsible for Malta’s equality and civil rights policy and its implementation, together with the country’s legislative reforms across various sectors of government. Cutajar resigned from her position as parliamentary secretary in February 2021 after calls for her resignation due to links with murder suspect Yorgen Fenech.

Education
Cutajar attended the Qormi Primary School, going on to the Maria Assunta Girls school in Hamrun for her secondary education. She attended the Giovanni Curmi Higher Secondary School. She graduated with a BA with Honours Degree as well as a Postgraduate Certificate from the University of Malta.

Political career
Elected to Malta's House of Representatives in 2017, the Hon. Cutajar worked on the introduction of legislation for civil rights, gender and equality in Malta, as well as the updating of existing laws. She has spoken out on a number of social, policy and bio-ethical concerns. Cutajar’s portfolio included the drafting of a new equality law which is still currently pending. She was also involved in Malta's Gender Balance Reform, the drafting of Malta’s National Action Plan against Racism and Xenophobia (NAPRAX), the updating of Malta's divorce laws, the securing of financial commitment towards Malta's first-ever LGBTIQ+ Community Hub, as well as securing Malta's winning bid for the hosting of EuroPride 2023. Cutajar worked on IVF legislation, the lowering of the voting age threshold to sixteen, action against domestic abuse, opened up the debate on a regulatory framework for prostitution, as well as working on a reform to decriminalise the responsible personal use of cannabis. Cutajar has also been responsible for the launch of a 24/7 helpline for victims of domestic violence.

Prior to her election to the Parliament of Malta, she was the first youngest female mayor of Qormi – one of Malta’s largest localities, a position she held for two consecutive terms.

Resignation
In February 2021, Cutajar resigned from her position as parliamentary secretary, pending an ethics investigation.

The resignation came after a number of reports in local papers that were published throughout February 2021. On the 14th of February the Times of Malta alleged that Cutajar took a €9,000 cut from a €40,000 in cash given to her by Yorgen Fenech as part of a 2019 property deal. Fenech was accused of complicity in the murder of Daphne Caruana Galizia on  30 November 2019. Standards Commissioner George Hyzler is evaluating a complaint about Cutajar's conduct after Times of Malta alleged she was being chased by the seller to repay a €46,500 brokerage fee.

On 21 February 2021, the Times of Malta further alleged that Cutajar had solicited Yorgen Fenech's help for a political survey in her district in 2019. In the same article it was alleged that Fenech promised some money to Cutajar in an exchange that read "I had to give you some money", to which she replied that they could speak about it at a later date. The alleged exchange came just a few weeks before Cutajar criticised a reference to 17 Black (Fenech's company) in a report drawn up by Dutch MP Pieter Omtzigt on journalist Daphne Caruana Galizia's death during a Council of Europe sitting, and 5 months before Fenech was arrested for the assassination of Daphne Caruana Galizia. It was by then known that Yorgen Fenech was the owner of 17 Black, a company that was to pay $2 million into ex-Minister Konrad Mizzi, and the ex-Chief of Staff, Keith Schembri's Panama companies, as revealed by the Panama Papers.

Personal life
Cutajar has been in a relationship with businessman Daniel Farrugia since 2019. Farrugia is co-owner of The Londoner British Pub chain in Sliema and Smart City.

References

Year of birth missing (living people)
Living people
Members of the House of Representatives of Malta
21st-century Maltese women politicians
21st-century Maltese politicians
Labour Party (Malta) politicians
Women mayors of places in Malta
1988 births